This is a list of Latvian football transfers in the 2013 summer transfer window by club. Only transfers of the Virslīga and 1. līga are included.

All transfers mentioned are shown in the references at the bottom of the page. If you wish to insert a transfer that isn't mentioned there, please add a reference.

Latvian Higher League

Daugava Daugavpils 

In:

Out:

Skonto 

In:

Out:

Ventspils 

In:

Out:

Liepājas Metalurgs 

In:

Out:

Spartaks 

In:

Out:

Jūrmala 

In:

Out:

Jelgava 

In:

Out:

METTA/LU 

In:

Out:

Daugava Rīga 

In:

Out:

Ilūkste 

In:

Out:

Latvian First League

Gulbene 

In:

Out:

Liepājas Metalurgs-2 

In:

Out:

Skonto-2 

In:

Out:

BFC Daugava Daugavpils 

In:

Out:

Rīgas Futbola skola 

In:

Out:

Ventspils-2 

In:

Out:

Varavīksne 

In:

Out:

Valmiera 

In:

Out:

Rēzekne 

In:

Out:

METTA-2 

In:

Out:

Auda 

In:

Out:

Tukums 2000/Salaspils 

In:

Out:

Jelgava-2 

In:

Out:

Jēkabpils 

In:

Out:

Daugava-2 Rīga 

In:

Out:

Jūrmala-2 

In:

Out:

References

External links 
 LFF apstiprinātais spēlētāju pāreju saraksts 
 futbolavirsliga.lv 
 sportacentrs.com 

2013
Latvia
Football
transfers